Boulogne-sur-Gesse (literally Boulogne on Gesse) is a commune of the Haute-Garonne department in southwestern France.

Geography
The river Gesse forms most of the commune's eastern border, while the Gimone forms part of its southwestern and northwestern borders.

Population

See also
Communes of the Haute-Garonne department

References

Communes of Haute-Garonne